Kazi Anwar Hossain is a retired Bangladeshi footballer who played as a right-winger. Anwar also holds an AFC C License, and has coached clubs like Wari Club, PWD Dhaka and Eskaton Sabuj Sangha Club. He established Pioneer Football League team Kazi Anwar Football Academy, in 1997.

Club career
Anwar made his Dhaka League debut in 1976, while playing for Abahani Krira Chakra. He soon became a regular face in the starting eleven for Abahani, scoring a goal in the 1977 league deciding game against Rahmatganj MFS, which Abahani won 3–1. With Abahani he won the league title four times durig his 8 year-long stay at the club, and also captained the side in 1982. After leaving Abahani in 1984, Anwar went onto play for Dhaka Wanderers, Dhanmondi Club before retiring in 1988–1989 while playing for PWD Dhaka.

International career
After being impressed by the winger during the 1978 AFC Youth Championship, coach Werner Bickelhaupt gave Anwar his international debut in 1979. In his debut year for Bangladesh he participated in both the 1980 AFC Asian Cup qualifiers and Korea Cup. Anwar's contribution to the team during the qualifiers earned him a place in the main squad for the 1980 AFC Asian Cup, in Kuwait.

Black September 1982
During his year as club captain in 1982, Anwar was involved in one of the most notorious incidents in Bangladeshi football, named as the "Black September" event. The incident took place during a Dhaka Derby on September 1982, when four Abahani players (Kazi Salahuddin, Golam Rabbani Helal, Ashrafuddin Ahmed Chunnu) alongside Anwar were arrested for protesting the referee's decision which later progressed into a fight involving the respective fans. Surprisingly, the court held Anwar and his teammates responsible for a conspiring a potential military coup, against military government Hussain Muhammad Ershad. Although Anwar was sentenced to six months in prison, he along with the other four footballers were released after 17 days.

Honours
Abahani Limited Dhaka
 Dhaka League = 1977, 1981, 1983, 1984
  Liberation Cup = 1977
 Federation Cup = 1982

Awards and accolades
2018 − National Sports Award.

References

 
1957 births
Bangladeshi footballers
Bangladesh international footballers
Bangladesh youth international footballers
Bangladeshi football managers
Abahani Limited (Dhaka) players
Sheikh Jamal Dhanmondi Club players
Association football wingers
People from Rangpur District
Bangladeshi football coaches
1980 AFC Asian Cup players
Recipients of the Bangladesh National Sports Award